Michael Barone may refer to:

Michael Barone (pundit) (born 1944), American political expert and conservative commentator
Michael Barone (radio host) (born 1946), host of American Public Media programs
Michael Barone (photographer), American art photographer
Mike Barone, American jazz trombonist and big band leader
Michael Barone, a character on the American television sitcom Everybody Loves Raymond played by Sullivan Sweeten